Virender Sehwag is an Indian cricketer whose aggressive batting has found success at the top of the batting order. He has scored centuries (100 or more runs) on 23 occasions in Test cricket and in 15 One Day International (ODI) matches but has not scored a century in a Twenty20 international.

In Tests, Sehwag has scored centuries against all the Test-cricket playing nations except Bangladesh and Zimbabwe, and is fifth on the list of leading Test century makers for India. In 2001, he became the eleventh Indian player to score a century on Test debut, with 105 runs against South Africa. His centuries have been scored at fourteen cricket grounds, eight of which were outside India. He has made six scores of 200 runs or more, of which a record three have come against Pakistan. One such innings, the 254 in Lahore, had him involved in a 410-run partnership with Rahul Dravid, which came within 3 runs of breaking the record for the highest first-wicket partnership in Tests, set by Pankaj Roy and Vinoo Mankad. The innings took only 247 balls and was the highest score at faster than a run a ball.  Sehwag is the first Indian to score a triple century (300 or more runs), and has done so twice—309 against Pakistan in Multan in 2004 and 319 against South Africa in Chennai in 2008. The latter is the fastest triple century in Test cricket, the 300 coming up off just 278 balls, and is also the highest score with a strike rate over 100. It was also rated as one of the top 10 Test innings of all time by the ICC rankings, and received special mention along with his 201* in Galle, in which he carried his bat as he was named the Wisden Leading Cricketer in the World in 2008. He is one of the only four batsmen to score two triple centuries, alongside Sir Donald Bradman, Brian Lara and Chris Gayle. He scored 12 centuries that have been converted to scores of 150 or greater, a record for the most consecutive hundreds of over 150. He has been dismissed five times in the nineties.

In ODIs, Sehwag has scored centuries against six opponents. His maiden century was made against New Zealand at the Sinhalese Sports Club, Colombo in 2001. He has scored a record five centuries in matches between them and India. One such century in Hamilton in 2009 was the fastest by an Indian, coming from 60 deliveries.  Of these centuries, five were scored at home grounds and eight were at away (opposition's home) or neutral venues. His highest score of 219, the second highest ODI score for India was made against the West Indies at the Holkar Cricket Stadium in Indore. He has been dismissed five times in the nineties.

Key

Test centuries

ODI centuries

Notes

References

External links 

Sehwag, Virender
Indian cricket lists